Moscovici is a surname, the Romanian spelling of Moskowitz. Notable people with the surname include:

 Ariel Moscovici (born 1956), Romanian-born French sculptor
 Ilie Moscovici (1885-1943), Romanian socialist activist and journalist
 Josef Moscovici, an occasional alternate spelling of Joseph Moskowitz (1879-1954), Romanian-American musician and restaurateur 
 Zeilic Moscovici/Virgiliu Monda (1898–1991), Romanian poet and novelist
 Pierre Moscovici (born 1957), French politician
 Serge Moscovici (1925-2014), Romanian-born French social psychologist
 Ghiță Moscu, also known as Gelber Moscovici and Alexandru Bădulescu (1895–1938), Romanian socialist and communist activist
 Alexandru Toma, also known as Solomon Moscovici (1875–1954), Romanian poet and journalist

See also 
 Moskowitz

Romanian-language surnames